Samuel Richardson (born 1738) was a justice of the peace and High Sheriff of Gloucestershire in 1787 and Glamorganshire in 1798. He resided at Hensol Castle.

References 

1738 births
Year of death missing
Justices of the peace
High Sheriffs of Gloucestershire
High Sheriffs of Glamorgan